Josette Nevière (8 April 1933 – 8 January 1986) was a French alpine skier. She competed in three events at the 1956 Winter Olympics.

References

1933 births
1986 deaths
French female alpine skiers
Olympic alpine skiers of France
Alpine skiers at the 1956 Winter Olympics
People from Thonon-les-Bains
Sportspeople from Haute-Savoie